Andrea Noszály (born 7 January 1970) is a Hungarian former professional tennis player.

Biography
Noszály, who grew up in Budapest, was raised in a sporting family. Her father Sandor Sr represented Hungary in high jump at the 1960 Rome Olympics and her younger brother Sándor Jr competed on the ATP Tour.

During her career she reached a best singles ranking of 208 in the world and appeared in a total of three Federation Cup ties for Hungary, across 1989 and 1990 (overall win/loss 3–2). This included a World Group second round fixture against reigning champions Czechoslovakia, in which she lost to Jana Novotná but won a dead rubber doubles.

ITF Circuit finals

Singles: 7 (5–2)

Doubles: 12 (2–10)

See also
 List of Hungary Fed Cup team representatives

References

External links
 
 
 

1970 births
Living people
Hungarian female tennis players
Tennis players from Budapest
20th-century Hungarian women